Rafael Nadal defeated the defending champion Novak Djokovic in a rematch of the previous year's final, 7–5, 6–3 to win the men's singles tennis title at the 2012 Italian Open. It was his record-extending sixth Italian Open title. He did not lose a set during the tournament.

Seeds
The top eight seeds receive a bye into the second round.

  Novak Djokovic (final)
  Rafael Nadal (champion)
  Roger Federer (semifinals)
  Andy Murray (third round)
  Jo-Wilfried Tsonga (quarterfinals)
  David Ferrer (semifinals)
  Tomáš Berdych (quarterfinals)
  Janko Tipsarević (second round)
  John Isner (second round)
  Juan Martín del Potro (third round)
  Gilles Simon (third round)
  Nicolás Almagro (third round)
  Gaël Monfils (second round)
  Juan Mónaco (third round)
  Feliciano López (first round)
  Richard Gasquet (quarterfinals)

Draw

Finals

Top half

Section 1

Section 2

Bottom half

Section 3

Section 4

Qualifying

Seeds

Qualifiers

Qualifying draw

First qualifier

Second qualifier

Third qualifier

Fourth qualifier

Fifth qualifier

Sixth qualifier

Seventh qualifier

References
Main Draw
Qualifying Draw

Italian Open - Singles
Men's Singles